Guilherme Felipe de Castro (born 2 May 1992), commonly known as Guilherme Batata, is a Brazilian professional footballer who plays as a defensive midfielder for UAE First Division League club Al Rams.

Club career

Early career
Born in Uberaba, Guilherme started off his career with Campeonato Série 2 side União Barbarense, playing on loan from Atlético Paranaense. After a season with União Barbarense, Guilherme went on loan to Campeonato Paulista side Ferroviária in 2014.

NorthEast United (loan)
In August 2014, it was announced that Guilherme had been included in a list of 49 players available for selection during the Indian Super League international draft. Guilherme was eventually drafted by NorthEast United. He went on to make his professional debut for the team on 13 October 2014, the date of the team's first ever match, against the Kerala Blasters. Guilherme played the whole 90 minutes as NorthEast United won 1–0 over the Blasters. He came on as a substitute after midfielder Isaac Chansa got injured in the match against Mumbai City on 25 October 2014 and scored his first goal for Northeast United in the Indian Super League.

International career 
Guilherme has represented the member of Brazil national under-17 football team since 2009. In 2009, he was first chosen national team. He played in 2009 FIFA U-17 World Cup.

Career statistics

Honours

International 
Brazil U-17
 South American Under-17 Championship: 2009

References

External links 
 Indian Super League Profile.

1992 births
Living people
Brazilian footballers
Brazilian expatriate footballers
Club Athletico Paranaense players
União Agrícola Barbarense Futebol Clube players
Associação Ferroviária de Esportes players
NorthEast United FC players
Guaratinguetá Futebol players
Luverdense Esporte Clube players
Oeste Futebol Clube players
Ħamrun Spartans F.C. players
Gokulam Kerala FC players
PSS Sleman players
Persela Lamongan players
Association football midfielders
Indian Super League players
Maltese Premier League players
I-League players
Liga 1 (Indonesia) players
Expatriate footballers in India
Expatriate footballers in Malta
Expatriate footballers in Indonesia
Brazilian expatriate sportspeople in India
Brazilian expatriate sportspeople in Malta
Brazilian expatriate sportspeople in Indonesia